Lynn Ellsworth Stalbaum (May 15, 1920June 17, 1999) was a U.S. representative from Wisconsin.

Stalbaum was born on a farm near Waterford, Wisconsin, in Racine County. He attended the public schools and graduated from the Racine County Agricultural School in 1936. He was employed with the United States Department of Agriculture in Racine County from 1936 to 1944, serving as administrative officer from 1937. Stabaum served in the United States Navy from 1944 to 1946 and was then a feed salesman from 1946 to 1951. He married Alice Gunderson in 1950. He was secretary-treasurer of the Racine Milk Producers Cooperative Association and manager of the Harmony Dairy Co. from 1951 to 1964. In 1954 he was elected to the Wisconsin State Senate (reelected in 1958 and 1962), where he served as caucus chairman in 1957, 1959, and 1961, and as assistant minority leader in 1963. He was elected as a Democrat to the Eighty-ninth Congress (January 3, 1965January 3, 1967) and was an unsuccessful candidate for reelection in 1966 to the Ninetieth Congress and for election in 1968 to the Ninety-first Congress. Stalbaum was a legislative consultant to rural electric and dairy cooperatives from 1968 to 1985. He resided in Bethesda, Maryland until his death on June 17, 1999.

References

External links

1920 births
1999 deaths
People from Waterford, Wisconsin
Democratic Party Wisconsin state senators
Democratic Party members of the United States House of Representatives from Wisconsin
20th-century American politicians